Gilgit Mountain is located on the border of Alberta and British Columbia at the head of Waitabit Creek and NE of Golden. It was named in 1898 by J. Norman Collie for Gilgit, Pakistan. Collie had accompanied Albert F. Mummery in an expedition to Nanga Parbat in 1895 where Mummery and two Gurkhas were killed in an avalanche on the mountain. Gilgit was the last civilization seen by the expedition.

See also
 List of peaks on the British Columbia–Alberta border
 List of mountains in the Canadian Rockies

References

Three-thousanders of Alberta
Three-thousanders of British Columbia
Canadian Rockies